Fatmir Prengaj (born 1 May 2001) is an Albanian professional footballer who plays as a forward for Albanian Superliga club Laçi.

Playing career
Prengaj made his first-team debut during the first leg of an Albanian Cup first round matchup against Naftëtari on September 12, 2018, and scored his first goal in the 9–0 second-leg victory two weeks later. He went on to make his Superiore debut on October 28, replacing Elvi Berisha in the final minutes of a 1–0 defeat to Kukësi.

Career statistics

Club

Notes

References

External links
 Fatmir Prengaj at FSHF.org
 
 

Living people
2001 births
Albanian footballers
Albania youth international footballers
Association football forwards
KF Laçi players
Kategoria Superiore players
People from Kurbin